Union Historic District is a national historic district located at Union, Monroe County, West Virginia.  The district includes 174 contributing buildings, 2 contributing sites, 7 contributing structures, and 1 contributing object in the Union and surrounding areas.

Notable properties include the Monroe County Courthouse (c. 1882), Union High School (1939), Monroe County Confederate Monument (1901), Monroe Department Store (1898), Watchman Office (c. 1870), Union Presbyterian Church (1922), Union United Methodist Church (c. 1889), old Baptist Church (c. 1845), All Saints Episcopal Church (c. 1873), old brick Methodist Church (c. 1831), old Union Academy (c. 1820), and Old Temperance Hall (c. 1849).  Located in the district are the separately listed Elmwood, Walnut Grove and Brig. Gen. John Echols House.

It was listed on the National Register of Historic Places in 1990.

Gallery

References

External links

National Register of Historic Places in Monroe County, West Virginia
Historic districts on the National Register of Historic Places in West Virginia
Greek Revival architecture in West Virginia
Queen Anne architecture in West Virginia
Buildings and structures in Monroe County, West Virginia
Historic American Buildings Survey in West Virginia
Historic districts in Monroe County, West Virginia
Bungalow architecture in West Virginia
American Craftsman architecture in West Virginia